George McGrath (born 16 November 1935) is  a former Australian rules footballer who played with Geelong in the Victorian Football League (VFL).

Notes

External links 
		

Living people
1935 births
Australian rules footballers from Victoria (Australia)
Geelong Football Club players
Warrnambool Football Club players